SARM Division No. 5 is a division of the Saskatchewan Association of Rural Municipalities (SARM) within the province of Saskatchewan, Canada.  It is located in the north central area of the province. There are 57 rural municipalities in this division. The current director for Division 5 is Judy Harwood.

List of Rural Municipalities in SARM Division No. 5

by numerical RM #

 RM No. 250 Last Mountain Valley
 RM No. 251 Big Arm
 RM No. 252 Arm River
 RM No. 253 Willner
 RM No. 254 Loreburn
 RM No. 279 Mount Hope
 RM No. 280 Wreford
 RM No. 281 Wood Creek
 RM No. 282 McCraney
 RM No. 283 Rosedale
 RM No. 284 Rudy
 RM No. 285 Fertile Valley
 RM No. 286 Milden
 RM No. 309 Prairie Rose
 RM No. 310 Usborne
 RM No. 312 Morris
 RM No. 313 Lost River
 RM No. 314 Dundurn
 RM No. 315 Montrose
 RM No. 316 Harris
 RM No. 339 Leroy
 RM No. 340 Wolverine
 RM No. 341 Viscount
 RM No. 342 Colonsay
 RM No. 343 Blucher
 RM No. 344 Corman Park
 RM No. 345 Vanscoy
 RM No. 346 Perdue
 RM No. 369 St. Peter
 RM No. 370 Humboldt
 RM No. 371 Bayne
 RM No. 372 Grant
 RM No. 373 Aberdeen
 RM No. 376 Eagle Creek
 RM No. 399 Lake Lenore
 RM No. 400 Three Lakes
 RM No. 401 Hoodoo
 RM No. 402 Fish Creek
 RM No. 403 Rosthern
 RM No. 404 Laird
 RM No. 429 Flett's Springs
 RM No. 430 Invergordon
 RM No. 431 St. Louis
 RM No. 434 Blaine Lake
 RM No. 435 Redberry
 RM No. 459 Kinistino
 RM No. 460 Birch Hills
 RM No. 461 Prince Albert
 RM No. 463 Duck Lake
 RM No. 464 Leask
 RM No. 490 Garden River
 RM No. 491 Buckland
 RM No. 493 Shellbrook
 RM No. 494 Canwood
 RM No. 520 Paddockwood
 RM No. 521 Lakeland
 RM No. 555 Big River

Footnotes

External links
SARM Division No. 5 members

SARM divisions of Saskatchewan